The Speaker of the Virginia House of Burgesses was the presiding officer of the House of Burgesses, the lower house of the Virginia General Assembly during the period in which Virginia was a colony of the Kingdom of England and, after 1707, the Kingdom of Great Britain.

The General Assembly itself was first organized in 1619, when the colony was owned and administered by the London Company. Twenty-two burgesses were elected to that Assembly, two each from eleven designated settlement areas in the colony. The Assembly formed a unicameral legislature made up of the burgesses and the appointed members of the Governor's Council, presided over by the Governor, George Yeardley. Yeardley designated his secretary, John Pory, a council member, as Speaker of the General Assembly. Pory, however, appears to have acted only as secretary of the Assembly.

The General (or Grand) Assembly met seventeen more times from that first session through 1642. Its legal standing was put in doubt when the London Company was dissolved in May 1624 and Virginia came under the direct administration of the Crown.

A crisis developed in the spring of 1635 when an unpopular governor, Sir John Harvey, was arrested and deported to England by his own Council. This led to the February 1639 reappointment of former Governor Sir Francis Wyatt. Wyatt's instructions acknowledged the legal status of the General Assembly and of land titles granted by the London Company, ending 15 years of legal limbo.

In late 1642 Sir William Berkeley was appointed Governor. He reorganized the Assembly into two houses along the lines of the English Parliament. The new lower house, the House of Burgesses, was to provide a counterweight to the Council-led group that had deposed Harvey. However, they maneuvered to elect one of their own, Thomas Stegg, as the first Speaker of the new House when it convened in March 1643.

Speaker Peyton Randolph supported independence in the 1770s. The House of Burgesses was called back by the Royal Governor Lord Dunmore one last time in June 1775 to address British Prime Minister Lord North's Conciliatory Resolution. Randolph, who was a delegate to the Continental Congress, returned to Williamsburg to take his place as Speaker. The House of Burgesses rejected the proposal, which was also later rejected by the Continental Congress. The burgesses met in conventions that served as a revolutionary provisional government for Virginia. Randolph served as the president of the conventions until his death in October 1775. The burgesses did not elect a new speaker, but did elect a new president for the conventions. 
They passed the role of the House of Burgesses to the House of Delegates when they adopted the Constitution of Virginia in June 1776.

See also
John Robinson estate scandal
List of members of the Virginia House of Burgesses
List of speakers of the Virginia House of Delegates

Notes

References

Speakers of the House of Burgesses

Speakers of the House of Burgesses
1643 establishments in Virginia